BC Perlas Energija, is a professional basketball club based in Vilnius, Lithuania, currently competing in the Nacionalinė krepšinio lyga. BC Perlas is a daughter club of the Lietuvos Rytas Vilnius.

Perlas club was founded in 2003. Over the decade the team had many variations of its name, but it always had the word "Perlas" (Pearl) in it except during 2012-2013 season, when it was called "Vilnius-MRU". It developed young prospects and became a springboard to professional career for former Lietuvos Rytas Vilnius players, Dovydas Redikas and BC Žalgiris former player Mindaugas Kuzminskas. Undoubtedly, Perlas’ best-known alumnus is Lietuvos Rytas Vilnius, Memphis Grizzlies and Lithuania men's national basketball team center Jonas Valančiūnas.

"Perlas-MRU" qualified for second tier Lithuanian basketball league (NKL) playoffs for the first time in the 2006-2007 season. An ambitious and young team in 2009 went on a commercial basis to play in the LKL. During two seasons in the league "Perlas-MRU" finished regular season respectively in 8th and 7th places. On 14 July 2011, the club merged with NKL champions „Pieno Žvaigždės“, with many players signing with BC Pieno žvaigždės as a result.

In 2011-2012 season after returning to the NKL, "Perlas-MRU" did not qualify for the playoffs. In 2012-2013 season the results for the team were much better. In the regular season Vilnius team was ranked 12th (14/20), but in the Round of 16 it eliminated fifth ranked Sūduva-Mantinga (2:1). In the quarterfinals, "Perlas-MRU" met with Jonavos "Triobet" but was eliminated after three intense matches.

In 2013-2014 season Perlas once again qualified for NKL playoffs. In round of 16 Mindaugas Sakalauskas players crushed Klaipedos Nafta-Universitetas (3:0) and in quarterfinals after 5 games was forced to concede to  Delikatesas Joniškis .

Players

Current roster

Notable players
 Jonas Valančiūnas
 Mindaugas Kuzminskas
 Eimantas Bendžius
 Arvydas Šikšnius
 Deividas Sirvydis
 Evaldas Kairys
 Dovis Bičkauskis
 Margiris Normantas
 Marek Blaževič
 Gytis Radzevičius
 Dominykas Domarkas
 Edvinas Šeškus
 Saulius Kulvietis
 Paulius Dambrauskas
 Vytautas Šarakauskas
 Vilmantas Dilys
 Augustas Marčiulionis
 Einaras Tubutis

History

References

External links
  
 BC Perlas at NKL.lt 

Basketball teams established in 2003
Basketball in Vilnius
Perlas
2003 establishments in Lithuania